Bake Off Brasil: Mão na Massa  (English: Bake Off Brasil: Hands On), often referred to as simply Bake Off Brasil or Bake Off is a Brazilian reality television series based on the BBC baking competition The Great British Bake Off.

The series premiered on Saturday, July 25, 2015, at 9:30 p.m. (BRT / AMT) on SBT, aiming to find the best amateur baker in Brazil.

Cast

Host and judges
The first two seasons were presented by Ticiana Villas Boas and judged by Carol Fiorentino and Fabrizio Fasano Jr. However, following Ticiana's departure due to the leak of her husband's controversial bribery allegations with president Michel Temer, Carol took her place in season three, with Beca Milano replacing her in the judging panel.

Following production of the first season of Junior Bake Off Brasil, Carol and Fasano left the show over contract disputes. Carol was replaced by Nadja Haddad in season 4. Beca remained as judge and was joined by Olivier Anquier from seasons 4–7. Olivier left the show following production of the second season of Bake Off Celebridades, with Giuseppe Gerundino replace him starting on season 8.

Key

Series overview

Ratings and reception

Spin-offs

Bake Off SBT
Bake Off SBT is a special holiday series featuring celebrities from SBT as contestants, aiming to find the best amateur celebrity baker from SBT. The series premiered on December 23, 2017.

Junior Bake Off Brasil
Junior Bake Off Brasil is a series featuring children from ages 8 to 13 as contestants, aiming to find the best junior baker in Brazil. The series premiered on January 6, 2018.

Bake Off Brasil: A Cereja do Bolo
Due to the impact of the COVID-19 pandemic on television, SBT pushed back the premiere of the new season of Fábrica de Casamentos to mid 2020 and opted to create Bake Off Brasil: A Cereja do Bolo (English: Bake Off Brasil: The Icing on the Cake) to fill the programming gap.

The series is a compilation show highlighting the most memorable moments of the franchise. The retrospectives are hosted by Nadja Haddad and also includes revisited recipes by judge Beca Milano, catch-ups with past contestants and appearances of celebrity guests Matheus Ceará and Juliana Oliveira. The series premiered on May 2, 2020. Ticiana Villas Boas replaced Nadja as the host on season 2. Beca Milano was joined by fellow Bake Off Brasil judge Olivier Anquier on season 2. Dony De Nuccio replaced Ticiana as the host on season 3.

Ratings and reception

Bake Off Celebridades
Bake Off Celebridades, is series featuring celebrities as contestants, aiming to find the best amateur celebrity baker in Brazil. However, unlike Bake Off SBT, it is a full celebrity series instead of a two-episode holiday special and the contestants are not necessarily employees of the network. The series premiered on February 20, 2021.

External links
 Bake Off Brasil on SBT.com.br
 Bake Off Brasil: A Cereja do Bolo on SBT.com.br

References

2015 Brazilian television series debuts
Brazilian reality television series
Brazil
Brazilian television series based on British television series